Diana Beauclerk, Duchess of St Albans (c. 1679–15 January 1742), born Lady Diana de Vere, was a British courtier. She was Mistress of the Robes to Caroline, Princess of Wales from 1714 to 1717.
She was one of the Hampton Court Beauties of Mary II of England.

Family
She was the daughter of Aubrey de Vere, 20th Earl of Oxford, and Diana Kirke. On 17 April 1694, she married Charles Beauclerk, 1st Duke of St Albans, an illegitimate son of King Charles II and his mistress Nell Gwynne, whereupon Diana became Duchess of St Albans.
Together Beauclerk and Diana had 12 children:
 Charles Beauclerk, 2nd Duke of St Albans (6 April 1696 – 27 July 1751)
 Lady Diana Beauclerk (born )
 Lord William Beauclerk (22 May 1698 – 23 February 1732/33)
 Admiral Vere Beauclerk, 1st Baron Vere of Hanworth (14 July 1699 – 21 October 1781)
 Colonel Lord Henry Beauclerk (11 August 1701 – 5 January 1761)
 Lord Sidney Beauclerk (27 February 1703 – 23 November 1744)
 Lieutenant-General Lord George Beauclerk (26 December 1704 – 11 May 1768)
 Lord Seymour Beauclerk (born 24 June 1708)
 Rt. Revd. Lord James Beauclerk ( - 20 October 1787), Bishop of Hereford 
 Lord Aubrey Beauclerk (1711 - 24 February 1740)
 Lady Mary Beauclerk (born )
 Lady Anne Beauclerk (born )

References

External links
 
 "Diana Beauclerk (née de Vere), Duchess of St Albans", National Portrait Gallery

1679 births
1742 deaths
Diana
English duchesses by marriage
Daughters of British earls
Ladies of the Bedchamber
Mistresses of the Robes
Diana
First Ladies of the Bedchamber
Diana
Household of Caroline of Brandenburg-Ansbach